Lorenzo Holzknecht (born 12 December 1984) is an Italian ski mountaineer.

Holzknecht was born in Sondalo. He started ski mountaineering in 2001 and competed first in the same year. He became a member of the national team in 2002.

Selected results 

 2004:
 3rd, World Championship ind. "juniors" class race
 2007:
 1st U23, European Championship vertical race (Morzine- Avoriaz)
 1st U23, European Championship ind. race
1st U23 Pierra Menta 
 2008:
 1st, Trofeo Angelo Gherardi 
 7th, World Championship team race (together with Ivan Murada)
2nd, Adamello Ski Raid
 2009:
 1st, European Championship relay race (together with Dennis Brunod, Manfred Reichegger and Damiano Lenzi)
 2nd, European Championship team race (together with Guido Giacomelli)
 3rd, European Championship ind. race
 3rd, European Championship combination ranking
 3rd, Valtellina Orobie World Cup race
1st, Vertical race Italian Championship
3rd, ind race Italian Championship
 2010
 1st, World Championship relay race (together with Damiano Lenzi, Dennis Brunod and Manfred Reichegger)
 3rd, World Championship team race (together with Damiano Lenzi)
 2011:
 2nd Overall Pierra Menta
2nd, World Championship team race (together with Manfred Reichegger)
1st, Team Race Italian Championship
 2012:
 1st Overall Pierra Menta
2nd, La Grand Course Overall
1st, European Championship team, together with Manfred Reichegger
 10th, European Championship ind.
 1st, Sellaronda Skimarathon (together with Michele Boscacci)
 2nd, 2012 Crested Butte Ski Mountaineering Race, single and total ranking
 3rd, 2012 Crested Butte Ski Mountaineering Race, sprint
1st, Vertical race Italian Championship
2013
3rd Overall Pierra Menta
3rd Overall Mezzalama Trophy
3rd Overall Adamello Ski Raid
1st, Team Race Italian Championship
1st Overall Italian Cup
2014
2nd Overall Sellaronda Skimarathon
3rd, ind race Italian Championship
2015
3rd, Vertical Race World Championships of Ski Mountaineering (Verbier)
1st Overall Sellaronda Skimarathon (new Record)
2nd Overall Mezzalama Trophy
3rd, Vertical race Italian Championship
2016
1st Overall Sellaronda Skimarathon

Pierra Menta 

 2002: 1st, cadets class race
 2010: 4th, together with Damiano Lenzi
 2011: 2nd, together with Guido Giacomelli
 2012: 1st, together with Manfred Reichegger

Trofeo Mezzalama 

 2007: 6th, together with Daniele Pedrini and Mattia Coletti
 2011: 7th, together with Guido Giacomelli and Jean Pellissier

References 

1984 births
Living people
Italian male ski mountaineers
World ski mountaineering champions
People from Sondalo
Sportspeople from the Province of Sondrio